ACCS may refer to:

 Adarsh Credit Cooperative Society, an Indian credit society
 Air Command and Control System, a NATO project to replace outdated technology
 Association of Classical and Christian Schools, an organization that encourages the formation of Christian schools using a model of classical education

See also
 List of United States Air Force airborne command and control squadrons for Airborne Command and Control Squadron
 American Association of Christian Colleges and Seminaries for American Christian College and Seminary, any school that is part of the association